Smithton Township is an inactive township in Pettis County, in the U.S. state of Missouri.

Smithton Township was erected in 1873, taking its name from the community of Smithton, Missouri.

References

Townships in Missouri
Townships in Pettis County, Missouri